Rubus fagifolius is a Mesoamerican species of brambles in the rose family. It grows in southern Mexico (Veracruz, Oaxaca, Chiapas) and Central America (Belize, Guatemala, El Salvador, Costa Rica).

Rubus fagifolius is a climbing perennial sometimes reaching 18 meters above the ground. Stems have curved prickles. Leaves are compound with 3 or 5 thick, leathery leaflets. Flowers are white. Fruits are red, the drupelets falling apart separately.

References

fagifolius
Flora of Central America
Flora of Mexico
Plants described in 1830